The R315 is a Regional Route in South Africa that connects Yzerfontein on the West coast with Malmesbury to the east via Darling.

Route 
From Yzerfontein, it heads east. It crosses the R27 to reach Darling. At Darling, it meets the R307 and becomes co-signed with it heading south. Just south of the town, it diverges, again heading east. It reaches Malmesbury, where it crosses the N7 and proceeds to end at a junction with the R302.

External links
 Routes Travel Info

References

Regional Routes in the Western Cape